Hope and Aid Direct is a humanitarian aid charity based in the UK that delivers aid directly to the Balkans. It was founded in 1999 by Charles Storer MBE with the motto "Taking Hope and Aid not Sides".

Hope and Aid Direct is a 100% voluntary humanitarian aid charity whose team members raise their own funds, obtain donations of aid, transport that aid in convoys of lorries twice a year, and give it out directly into the hands of the people who need it the most. 

The convoys often carry out humanitarian work whilst they are away. Hope and Aid Direct has been involved in projects such as rebuilding bombed schools, renovating orphanages and delivering aid for third parties who would not be as welcome in some areas. For the duration of the convoys are fitted out with Pmr Radio equipment serviced and fitted by Maidstone YMCA ARS.

The Charity has links with the Mother Teresa Organization in Kosovo and various charities in Greece and Lesbos. 

Volunteers come from every corner of the UK and from all walks of life. Whilst in recent years most work has been carried out in Kosovo, humanitarian aid has also been distributed in Romania, Bosnia, Croatia and Serbia. More recently the charity has been focused upon the Syrian refugees in Europe. Convoys of aid are regularly being delivered to mainland Greece, Lesbos, Chios and Serbia. 

Four team members joined workers in Sri Lanka in the aftermath of the 2004 Indian Ocean earthquake and tsunami, one of the worst natural disasters seen by any of us. There is also have an ongoing project in Nigeria.

References

External links
Hope and Aid Direct website
Maidstone YMCA ARS

Charities based in Essex
Foreign charities operating in Kosovo